The Link Tour K-One is a subcompact car crossover produced by Link Tour since October 2018. Link Tour is a brand introduced by Link Tour Holdings, the joint venture between Yogomo and Great Wall Motor. Four out of the five vehicles would support battery swapping and one of the A0-segment model would carry three portable battery packs.

Overview
The Link Tour K-ONE provides two variants of electric motor and battery packs based on different trim level configurations. The two electric motor options are able to generate maximum power of  respectively, with a corresponding peak torque of 170N·m and 230 N·m. The two ternary lithium battery pack options features a maximum capacity of 40.55 kW/h and 46.2 kW/h, allowing the vehicle to travel up to  respectively under the NEDC (new European driving cycle). Based on the NEDC driving cycle the energy consumption of the 2018 Link Tour Link Tour K-One 400 EV is 14.6 kWh/100 km.

References

Cars introduced in 2018
Subcompact cars
Front-wheel-drive vehicles
Hatchbacks
Production electric cars
Cars of China